Ernő Nagy (2 August 1898 – 8 December 1977) was a Hungarian fencer. He won a gold medal in the team sabre event at the 1932 Summer Olympics. Other members of the team included Aladár Gerevich, Gyula Glykais, Endre Kabos, Attila Petschauer, and György Piller. He retired from competition in 1938, at which point he became head of the fencing section of the Hungarian Athletics Club.

References

External links
 

1898 births
1977 deaths
Hungarian male sabre fencers
Olympic fencers of Hungary
Fencers at the 1932 Summer Olympics
Olympic gold medalists for Hungary
People from Timiș County
Olympic medalists in fencing
Medalists at the 1932 Summer Olympics